The 1906 election for Mayor of Los Angeles was held on December 4, Arthur Cyprian Harper was elected.

Results

References

External links
 Office of the City Clerk, City of Los Angeles

1906
1906 California elections
Los Angeles
1900s in Los Angeles